Honorary Aryan was an expression used in Nazi Germany to describe the formal or unofficial status of persons, including some Mischlinge, who were not recognized as belonging to the Aryan race, according to Nazi standards, but treated as if considered to be part of it.

The prevalent explanation as to why the status of "honorary Aryan" was bestowed by the Nazis upon other non-Aryan race peoples, is relatively vague but was mostly explained that the services of those peoples were deemed "valuable" to the German economy or war effort, or simply for other purely political or propaganda reasons.

In the Independent State of Croatia, a Nazi client country, this term was used by Ante Pavelić to protect some Jews from persecution who had been useful to the state.

Notable inclusions
Hitler declared that the Chinese and Japanese peoples were honorary Aryans. There was extensive cooperation between China and Germany from 1926, but became untenable when the Second Sino-Japanese War broke out and Japan insisted on a cessation. Germany signed the Tripartite Pact, along with Japan and Italy, at the end of 1940. In July 1941, Hitler officially recognized Wang Jingwei's puppet government in Nanking. After the attack on Pearl Harbor, China formally joined the Allies and declared war on Nazi Germany on December 9, 1941. In retaliation, the Nazis persecuted ethnic Chinese in Nazi Germany.
Helmuth Wilberg, Luftwaffengeneral and 1st-degree Mischling was declared to be Aryan in 1935 by Hitler at the instigation of Hermann Göring.
Amin al-Husseini, a Palestinian and the Mufti of the British Mandate of Palestine, "was granted the status of honorary Aryan" by the Nazis, although people of the Far East and Arabia were considered "half-monkeys" by Hitler.
Stephanie von Hohenlohe, a Jewish-Austrian princess by marriage and a spy for Nazi Germany, was declared an honorary Aryan by Heinrich Himmler.
Emil Maurice, Hitler's first personal chauffeur and a very early member of the Nazi-Party, was a member of the SS, but ran afoul of Heinrich Himmler's rules, which required SS men to have deep Aryan ancestry, since Maurice's great-grandfather was Jewish.  Himmler considered him a security-risk, and he tried to have him thrown out, but Hitler stood by his old friend and, in a secret letter dated 31 August 1935, he required Himmler to allow Maurice and his brothers to remain in the SS.  They were considered to be "Honorary Aryans".
 Sophie Lehár (née Paschkis), the wife of the composer Franz Lehár, had been Jewish before her conversion to Catholicism upon her marriage. Hitler enjoyed Lehár's music and the Nazis made some propaganda use of it. After Joseph Goebbels intervened on Lehár's behalf, Mrs. Lehár was given in 1938 the status of "honorary Aryan" by marriage. This certainly saved her life; during the war, attempts were made at least once to have her deported, which was stopped only due to her status.
 Helene Mayer, a German-born fencer being forced to leave Germany in 1935 and resettle in the United States because she was Jewish, took part as an "honorary Aryan" at the 1936 Olympics in Berlin, where she won the silver medal for Germany.

See also
 Anti-Comintern Pact
 Germany–Japan industrial co-operation before World War II
 German–Japanese relations
 Honorary whites
 Presidential exemption (Slovak State)
 Racial policy of Nazi Germany
 Tripartite Pact
 Gunther Burstyn

Notes

References

Aryanism
Empire of Japan
Germany–Japan relations
Nazi terminology
Racism in Germany
White supremacy